{{DISPLAYTITLE:C22H18O11}}
The molecular formula C22H18O11 (molar mass: 458.37 g/mol, exact mass: 458.084911) may refer to:

 Epigallocatechin gallate (EGCG), a flavanol found in green tea
 Gallocatechin gallate (GCG), an epimer of EGCG formed in high temperature